The Division of Flinders is an Australian Electoral Division in Victoria. The division is one of the original 65 divisions contested at the first federal election. It is named for Matthew Flinders, the first man to circumnavigate Australia, and the person credited with giving Australia its name.

Originally a country seat south and east of Melbourne, Flinders is now based on the outer southern suburbs on the Mornington Peninsula, including Dromana, Hastings and Portsea. Even though Melbourne's suburban growth has long since spilled onto the peninsula, Flinders is still counted as a rural seat.

Geography
Since 1984, federal electoral division boundaries in Australia have been determined at redistributions by a redistribution committee appointed by the Australian Electoral Commission. Redistributions occur for the boundaries of divisions in a particular state, and they occur every seven years, or sooner if a state's representation entitlement changes or when divisions of a state are malapportioned.

History

It has usually been a fairly safe seat for the Liberal Party and its predecessors, who have held it for all but six years since its creation.  However, it has occasionally been won by the Australian Labor Party, notably at the 1929 federal election when Prime Minister Stanley Bruce was defeated. This was the first of two times an incumbent Australian prime minister lost his own seat at a general election; the second time was not until Liberal Prime Minister John Howard lost his seat of Bennelong at the 2007 federal election.

The seat's most prominent member was Bruce, who held it for all but two years from 1918 to 1933.  Other prominent former members include Jack Holloway, the Labor challenger who ousted Bruce and later a senior minister in the Curtin and Chifley governments (though he was the member for Melbourne Ports by then) and two deputy Liberal leaders – Sir Phillip Lynch (a minister in the Gorton, McMahon and Fraser governments) and Peter Reith (a minister in the Howard government).

Members

Election results

References

External links
 Division of Flinders - Australian Electoral Commission

Electoral divisions of Australia
Constituencies established in 1901
1901 establishments in Australia
Mornington Peninsula
Sorrento, Victoria
Electoral districts and divisions of Greater Melbourne